Summit is a train station in Summit, New Jersey, served by New Jersey Transit's Morris & Essex Lines (the Gladstone Branch and Morristown Line). The station sits between Union Place on the north and Broad Street on the south, with station access via either side, and between Summit Avenue on the east and Maple Avenue on the west. Constructed in 1904–1905 by the Delaware, Lackawanna and Western Railroad in a mile-long open cut, it is one of the few NJ Transit stations with platforms below street level.

History
The station had served several Delaware, Lackawanna and Western Railroad, and then Erie-Lackwanna Railroad, named passenger trains. These included the Lake Cities, Owl/New York Mail, Twilight/Pocono Express and the DLW flagship train, the Phoebe Snow.

The station was cosmetically renovated for the 2005 PGA Championship at the Baltusrol Golf Club in nearby Springfield. Status screens were installed on the platforms to show the next train and the platforms, and fittings were painted. The screens are still present. During that time, buses were used as the connection to go to and from the PGA Championship.

On December 20, 2018, New Jersey Governor Phil Murphy chose the station as the venue to sign legislation to reform the management of NJ Transit.

Station layout and services
There are two platforms and three tracks: Track 1 is served by a side platform, while Tracks 2 and 3 are served by the island platform. The side platform is accessible via the station overpass or directly from the Union Place parking lot, while the island platform can only be accessed via the overpass.

In the early morning hours, trains on the Gladstone Branch originate at Gladstone Station with a final destination to Hoboken Terminal. Trains going to New York Pennsylvania Station (New York Penn Station) originate in Dover.

On weekends, the Gladstone Branch trains only operate between Summit and Gladstone, requiring passengers wishing to travel farther east to transfer across the platform to a Morristown Line train, which operates between Dover and New York (as well as Hoboken via a transfer at Newark Broad Street station).

The station has a small parking lot on its property that slopes down from Union Place. Another large lot is across Summit Avenue, accessible from Broad Street. In the 1990s, a multistory parking garage was built on part of the Broad Street lot. In the days after the September 11, 2001 terrorist attacks, the city made daily chalk marks on the tires of the many unclaimed vehicles to help identify those missing.

The station also has a waiting room with a small coffee and newspaper shop that is open at morning commute time and then through the afternoon rush hour.

Gallery

Bibliography

References

External links

 Station House from Google Maps Street View

NJ Transit Rail Operations stations
Summit, New Jersey
Railway stations in the United States opened in 1837
Former Delaware, Lackawanna and Western Railroad stations
Railway stations in Union County, New Jersey
1837 establishments in New Jersey